Karigan (also Romanized as Karīgān; also known as Gavīgān (Persian: گويگان) and Gūy Kan) is a village in Gevar Rural District, Sarduiyeh District, Jiroft County, Kerman Province, Iran. At the 2006 census, its population was 309, in 77 families.

References 

Populated places in Jiroft County